Richard Stanton (October 8, 1876 – May 22, 1956) was an American actor and director of the silent era. He appeared in 68 films between 1911 and 1916. He also directed 57 films between 1914 and 1925. He was born in Iowa and died in Los Angeles, California.

Stanton was described as a "handsome, musical fellow", but was also a capable pugilist, demonstrating his boxing skills to two other fighters he worked with in a film.

Selected filmography
 In the Secret Service (1913)
 The Wasp (1915)
 Graft (1915)
 The Yankee Way (1917)
 One Touch of Sin (1917)
 The Spy (1917)
 Cheating the Public (1918)
 Rough and Ready (1918)
 Bride 13 (1920)
 The Face at Your Window (1920)
 McGuire of the Mounted (1923)
 American Pluck (1925)

References

External links

1876 births
1956 deaths
Male actors from Iowa
American male film actors
American film directors
American male silent film actors
20th-century American male actors